The 111th Street station (signed as 111th Street–Greenwood Avenue station) is a station on the IND Fulton Street Line of the New York City Subway, located on Liberty Avenue at 111th Street in Richmond Hill, Queens. The station is served by the A train at all times.

History
111th Street was one of the six stations along Liberty Avenue in Queens, from 80th Street through Ozone Park–Lefferts Boulevard, as well as the current three track elevated structure, built for the BMT Fulton Street Line in 1915 as part of BMT's portion of the Dual Contracts. The connection to the BMT was severed on April 26, 1956, and the IND was extended east (railroad south) from Euclid Avenue via a connecting tunnel and new intermediate station at Grant Avenue, with the new service beginning on April 29, 1956. The Fulton Street Elevated west of Hudson Street was closed, and eventually demolished.

The station has gone by a number of different names. It opened as Greenwood Avenue. A 1924 system map portrayed the station as "Greenwood Avenue" with "111th St." below it in parentheses and smaller print. By 1948, "Greenwood" and "111 St." were shown in equal sizes, and by 1959, the station's name was shown as "111 St–Greenwood". The current official map shows the name as just "111 St". However, station signs still show "111th Street–Greenwood Avenue".

The Queens-bound platform was completely renovated in 2015 and reopened on December 12. The Brooklyn-bound platform was completely rehabilitated and reopened in Spring 2016.

Station layout

This elevated station, opened on September 25, 1915, has three tracks and two side platforms, with the middle track not used in revenue service. Both platforms have beige windscreens for the entire length and brown canopies with green frames and support columns except for a small section at either ends.

Exits
This station has two entrances/exits, both of which are elevated station houses beneath the tracks. The full-time side is at the east (railroad south) end. It has one staircase to each platform, a waiting area that allows a free transfer between directions, a turnstile bank, a token booth, and two staircases down to either eastern corners of Liberty Avenue and 111th Street. The other station house also has one staircase to each platform, waiting area, and two staircases to 109th Street and Liberty Avenue (one to the southeast corner and another along the north side of Liberty Avenue). However, this entrance/exit is unstaffed, containing just High Entry/Exit and Exit-Only turnstiles.

References

External links 
 
 111th Street entrance from Google Maps Street View
 109th Street entrance from Google Maps Street View
 Platforms from Google Maps Street View

BMT Fulton Street Line stations
IND Fulton Street Line stations
New York City Subway stations in Queens, New York
Railway stations in the United States opened in 1915
Richmond Hill, Queens
1915 establishments in New York City
Ozone Park, Queens